Tofieldia calyculata is a species of flowering plant belonging to the family Tofieldiaceae.

Its native range is Gotland to Pyrenees and Ukraine.

References

Tofieldiaceae